Taczanowskia is a genus of orb-weaver spiders first described by Eugen von Keyserling in 1879. Contrary to the common name of the group, spiders of the genus Taczanowskia do not build webs and are furtive hunters, deceiving their prey by producing sex pheromones that attract male moths, and catching their prey by using a pair of enlarged claws at the tip of their anterior legs.

Species
 it contains six species from South America and Mexico:
Taczanowskia gustavoi Ibarra-Núñez, 2013 – Mexico
Taczanowskia mirabilis Simon, 1897 – Bolivia, Brazil
Taczanowskia onowoka Jordán, Domínguez-Trujillo, & Cisneros-Heredia, 2021 – Ecuador
Taczanowskia sextuberculata Keyserling, 1892 – Colombia, Brazil
Taczanowskia striata Keyserling, 1879 (type) – Peru, Brazil, Argentina
Taczanowskia trilobata Simon, 1897 – Brazil

References

Araneidae
Araneomorphae genera
Spiders of Mexico
Spiders of South America
Taxa named by Eugen von Keyserling